Johan Ihre (3 March 1707 – 1 December 1780) was a Swedish philologist and historical linguist.

Life
Ihre was born in Lund, son of the theologian Thomas Ihre and his spouse Brita Steuchia. After his father's death in 1720, Johan Ihre was raised in the house of his grandfather Archbishop Mattias Stechius in Uppsala, and studied at Uppsala University, where he completed his magister degree in 1730. In 1730-1733 he studied abroad, in Oxford, London and Paris. He was in 1734 appointed docent in Uppsala, 1735 librarian at the University Library, and was from 1737 until his death holder of the Skyttean professorship in Eloquence and Government. He became a member of the Royal Academy of Letters in 1755. He was secretary of the Royal Swedish Society of Sciences in Uppsala.

Works
Ihre was the first scholar to recognize the sound change of the Germanic languages that was later to be elaborated on by Rasmus Christian Rask and Jakob Grimm and now known after the latter as Grimm's law.

In 1737 the German philologist Johann Georg Wachter (1663–1757) published an etymological dictionary of the German language, Glossarium Germanicum. This book had a great influence on Johan Ihre: in 1769 he published, along the same lines as Wachter's work, a Swedish etymological dictionary. Ihre's etymological dictionary of Swedish demonstrated the origin of words in Old Swedish forms and compared them to cognates in other languages. Ihre thought, in accordance with the historical speculations common at the time and derived from Icelandic sources, that the language had been brought to the Nordic countries by Odin. Ihre was also the first to demonstrate that the text of the Codex argenteus manuscript in the Uppsala University Library is identical to the Gothic Bible translation by Bishop Wulfila.

Selected bibliography of Ihre's works
Utkast till föreläsningar öfwer swenska språket, 1745
Fragmenta versonis Ulphilanae, continentia particulas..., 1763
Swenskt dialect lexicon, 1766
Anmärkningar, rörande Codex argenteus i Upsala, 1767
Analecta Ulphilana, 1767-1769
Glossarium Suiogothicum, 1769
Scripta versionem Ulphilanam et linguam Moeso-Gothicam illustrantia, 1773

Notes and references

External links
 Ihre's archive at Uppsala University Library

1707 births
1780 deaths
Academic staff of Uppsala University
Uppsala University alumni
Swedish philologists
Linguists from Sweden
Historical linguists
Age of Liberty people
18th-century Swedish scientists
Swedish librarians